Wang Ling may refer to:

 Wang Ling (Three Kingdoms) (200–250), nephew of Wang Yun, general of Cao Wei during the Three Kingdoms period
 Wang Ling (historian) (1917–1994), Chinese historian known for his collaboration with Joseph Needham
 Wang Ling (basketball) (born 1978), female Chinese basketball player
 Wang Ling (Qin general), general of the Qin state in the Warring States period of Chinese history
 Wang Ling (Han Dynasty), Han Dynasty general

See also
 Lin Wang (1917–2003), Asian elephant